"The Unified Field" / "Quiet the Mind" is the first release, a double A-side, by IAMX and is taken from the fifth studio album The Unified Field. On 19 October the name of the release was confirmed on IAMX's PledgeMusic page.

Track listing

Music videos

The Unified Field

The music video, which was filmed in Sydney, Australia, shows a homeless man on a street moving his hands as if playing a piano.  He observes a tattooed man washing a car window and then leaving the window wiper down on a bench.  The homeless man picks it up and then waves it about like a conductor's baton while walking down the street before he stops in front of someone's car and waves the window wiper in sync with the window wipers on the driver's car, as the driver looks on.

The driver drives off and the man is surrounded by cars with horns blaring, before he removes his jacket to reveal a scraggly suit.  He continues to wave the window wiper like the conductor's baton before the place is surrounded in a blaze of light and he uses the baton to control everything around him, even rides at a carnival.  Towards the end of the video, a man takes the window wiper away from the homeless man and the latter walks away until he reaches a cliffside.  Again, he waves his hands like a conductor making the waves move in time until the song ends.  He smiles.

The concept of the video is based on the unified field theory.

Quiet the Mind

The music video, the fourth to be directed and edited by Chris in collaboration with Danny Drysdale, includes scenes of him playing the guitar and submerged up to his waist in a puddle of water wearing a hooded jacket.  Janine wears a gas mask and is on a building site.

Charts 

The Unified Field

References

 "The Unified Field/Quiet The Mind" digital EP
 

IAMX songs
2012 singles
Songs written by Chris Corner
2012 songs